Love, Pain & the Whole Crazy Thing (stylized as Love, Pain & the whole crazy thing) is the fifth studio album by Australian country music singer Keith Urban. It is his fourth album release in the United States, and his fifth for Capitol Nashville. The album was issued on 7 November 2006. It includes four singles with "Once in a Lifetime", "Stupid Boy", "I Told You So" and "Everybody", all of which were Top 10 hits on the Billboard country charts. The album has been certified Platinum by the RIAA, CRIA, and ARIA. Urban produced the album with Dann Huff except for "Tu Compañía" and "Got It Right This Time", which Urban produced by himself. It won at the 2007 ARIA Music Awards for Best Country Album.

Content
On the US Billboard Hot Country Songs chart dated 2 September 2006, this album's lead-off single "Once in a Lifetime" debuted at number 17, making it the highest-debuting country single in the 62-year history of the Billboard country music charts at the time. This record was later broken in 2007 by Kenny Chesney's "Don't Blink" (which debuted at number 16 on the same chart), and then again by Garth Brooks' "More Than a Memory" (which debuted at number 1). "Once in a Lifetime" went on to peak at number 6 on the country charts. The other three singles released from this album are "Stupid Boy", "I Told You So", and "Everybody", which went to numbers 3, 2, and 5 individually, making this Urban's first American album to not produce a single number one hit on the country charts. "Raise the Barn", a duet with Ronnie Dunn of Brooks & Dunn, was written in response to Hurricane Katrina.

The song "I Can't Stop Loving You" is a cover of a Leo Sayer song, later covered by Phil Collins in 2002. "Stupid Boy" was originally recorded by Sarah Buxton, who also co-wrote the song.

Track listing

Notes
 All songs produced by Keith Urban and Dann Huff, except tracks 11 and 13, produced solely by Urban.
 The Japanese edition omits "Raise the Barn" but adds "Gotta Let It Go" as track 13. The international version omits "Raise the Barn".

Personnel
As listed in liner notes.
Keith Urban – lead vocals, background vocals, lead guitar, acoustic guitar, rhythm guitar, ganjo, EBow, slide guitar, bass guitar, piano, keyboards, mandolin, bouzouki, percussion, papoose, drum machine programming
Beth Beeson – french horn
Tom Bukovac – rhythm guitar
Larry Corbett – cello
Eric Darken – percussion
Mark Douthit – tenor saxophone
Dan Dugmore – pedal steel guitar
Jerry Flowers – background vocals
Barry Green – trombone
Mike Haynes – trumpet
Erin Horner – french horn
Dann Huff – rhythm guitar, acoustic guitar, percussion
Chris McHugh – drums, percussion
Rami Jaffee – Hammond organ
Tim Lauer – synthesizer, accordion, harmonium, pump organ, piano
Doug Moffatt – baritone saxophone
Monty Powell – bass guitar
Eric Rigler – tin whistle, Uilleann pipes
Jimmie Lee Sloas – bass guitar
David Stone – upright bass
Russell Terrell – background vocals
Joy Worland – french horn
Jonathan Yudkin – fiddle
David Campbell - string arranger, conductor
All strings performed by the Nashville String Machine.

Chart positions

Weekly charts

Year-end charts

Singles

Certifications

References

2006 albums
ARIA Award-winning albums
Keith Urban albums
Capitol Records albums
Albums produced by Dann Huff